Frock Me is a British fashion and music television series hosted by fashion icon Alexa Chung, designer Henry Holland and style scout Gemma Cairney. The show has a fast-paced magazine format exploring the relationship between and influences of music and fashion on each other; featuring big-name designers, celebrity guests and bands. It was first broadcast within Channel 4's teen zone T4 from October 2008 as a seven-part studio series. A second location-based series of six episodes aired on T4 and late-night Channel 4 in April/May 2010.

Each episode of the show was themed around a current youth and fashion trend, and explored the music and fashion connections and influences behind each trend. The guests, features and bands in each show related to this theme.

The funding for the second series of the show was provided by UK clothing retailer TK Maxx.

List of Episodes

Series One Themes (Autumn/Winter 2008) 
 Rock & Roll Jeans
 Logos Slogans and Labels
 Club Chic
 Gothic Horror
 Vintage
 Sportswear
 Anti-Fashion

Series Two Themes (Spring/Summer 2010) 
 Military
 Underwear as Outerwear
 Prints
 Americana
 Romance
 Festival Fashion

References

External links
 
 
 

2008 British television series debuts
2010 British television series endings
2000s British reality television series
2010s British reality television series
Channel 4 original programming
English-language television shows
2000s British music television series
2010s British music television series